Watford Football Club is an English football team, based in Watford, Hertfordshire. 1977–78 was the club's first season under the management of Graham Taylor, and its last in the fourth tier of English football. Watford ended the season as champions of the Football League Fourth Division with 71 points, the club's highest Football League total under the system of two points for a win, and three points short of the all-time Football League record set by Graham Taylor's Lincoln City side in 1975–76. The season also marked new club records for the most league wins in a season (30), most home wins (18), most away wins (12), and most away goals scored (42).

Ross Jenkins finished at the club's top scorer for the third time in four campaigns, with 18 goals in all competitions. He was followed by Alan Mayes and Keith Mercer with 16 and 13 goals respectively; both men also scored hat-tricks for the team. Bobby Downes and Alan Garner made the most appearances, playing some part in all 54 competitive fixtures. Garner went on to receive the Watford F.C. Player of the Season award for his efforts. Other player milestones included the arrival of future club captain Ian Bolton, and the breakthrough into the first team of young striker Luther Blissett, who went on to become the club's all-time leading appearance maker and goalscorer.

Results
Watford's score listed first

Legend

Football League Fourth Division

FA Cup

League Cup

League table

References
General
Watford Football Club official site

Specific

Watford
Watford F.C. seasons